Moses (Moritz) Hess (21 January 1812 – 6 April 1875) was a German-Jewish philosopher, early communist and Zionist thinker. His socialist theories led to disagreements with Karl Marx and Friedrich Engels. He is considered a pioneer of Labor Zionism.

Biography
Moses Hess was born in Bonn, which was under French rule at the time. In his French-language birth certificate, his name is given as "Moïse"; he was named after his maternal grandfather. His father was an ordained rabbi, but never practiced this profession. Hess received a Jewish religious education from his grandfather, and later studied philosophy at the University of Bonn, but never graduated.

He married a poor Catholic seamstress, Sibylle Pesch, "in order to redress the injustice perpetrated by society". Although they remained happily married until Hess' death, Sibylle may have had an affair with Friedrich Engels while he was smuggling her from Belgium to France to be reunited with her husband. Sibylle, however, claimed the relationship was non-consensual and accused Engels of rape. The incident may have precipitated Hess' split from the Communist movement.

Hess was an early proponent of socialism, and a precursor to what would later be called Zionism. As correspondent for the Rheinische Zeitung, a radical newspaper founded by liberal Rhenish businessmen, he lived in Paris. Hess initially introduced Engels to communism, through his theoretical approach.

Marx, Engels and Hess took refuge in Brussels, Belgium, in 1845, and used to live in the same street. By the end of the decade, Marx and Engels had fallen out with Hess. The work of Hess was also criticized in part of The German Ideology by Marx and Engels.

Hess fled to Switzerland temporarily following the suppression of the 1848 commune. He would also go abroad during the Franco-Prussian War of 1870–1871. During the 1850s Hess immersed himself into studying the natural sciences and gaining, in an autodidactic fashion, a scientific foundation for his thoughts.

Hess died in Paris in 1875. As he requested, he  was buried in the Jewish cemetery of Cologne. In 1961, he was re-interred in the Kinneret Cemetery in Israel along with other Socialist-Zionists such as Nachman Syrkin, Ber Borochov, and Berl Katznelson.

Moshav Kfar Hess was named in his honour.

Views and opinions
Hess became reluctant to base all history on economic causes and class struggle (as Marx and Engels did), and he came to see the struggle of races, or nationalities, as the prime factor of history.

According to George Lichtheim, Hess, who differed from Marx on a number of issues, still testified in a letter to Alexander Herzen that what he and Herzen were writing about "resembles a neat sketch drawn on paper, whereas Marx's judgment upon these events [European upheavals] is as it were engraved with iron force in the rock of time" (Paraphrased by George Lichtheim, A Short History of Socialism, 1971 p. 80).

From 1861 to 1863, he lived in Germany, where he became acquainted with the rising tide of German antisemitism. It was then that he reverted to his Jewish name Moses (after going by Moritz Hess) in protest against Jewish assimilation. He published Rome and Jerusalem in 1862. Hess interprets history as a circle of race and national struggles. He contemplated the rise of Italian nationalism and the German reaction to it, and from this he arrived at the idea of Jewish national revival, and at his prescient understanding that the Germans would not be tolerant of the national aspirations of others and would be particularly intolerant of the Jews. His book calls for the establishment of a Jewish socialist commonwealth in Palestine, in line with the emerging national movements in Europe and as the only way to respond to antisemitism and assert Jewish identity in the modern world.

Scholarly work
Hess's Rome and Jerusalem: The Last National Question went unnoticed in his time, as most German Jews preferred cultural assimilation. His work did not stimulate political activity or discussion.  When Theodor Herzl first read Rome and Jerusalem he wrote that "since Spinoza Jewry had no bigger thinker than this forgotten Moses Hess." He said he might not have written  (The Jewish State) if he had known Rome and Jerusalem beforehand. Vladimir Ze'ev Jabotinsky honored Hess in The Jewish Legion in the World War as one of the people that made the Balfour declaration possible, along with Herzl, Walter Rothschild and Leon Pinsker.

Published works
Holy History of Mankind (1837)
European Triarchy (1841)
 Socialism and Communism (1842)
 Die Philosophie der Tat (The Philosophy of Action, 1843)
On the Monetary System, also translated as On the Essence of Money (Über das Geldwesen, 1845)
Communist Confession of Faith (London, 1846)
Consequences of a Revolution of the Proletariat (1847)
Rome and Jerusalem Leipzig: Eduard Mengler (1862)
Letters on the Mission of Israel (1864)
High Finance and the Empire (1869)
Les Collectivistes et les Communistes (1869)
The Dynamic Theory of Matter (1877)
 Jüdische Schriften (anthology edited by Theodor Zlocisti; Berlin: Louis Lamm, 1905)

Translations 
The Holy History and Mankind and Other Writings. ed. Shlomo Avineri (Cambridge University Press, 2005).
The History of the Jews, Volume III, Graetz (1866–1867, into French)

References

Further reading
Shlomo Na'aman, Emanzipation und Messianismus. Leben und Werk des Moses Heß (Frankfurt a.M./New York,1982) (in German)

External links 
 
 
 
 Hess: The Holy History of Mankind and Other Writings (Frontmater of the book), ed. & trans by Shlomo Avineri (2004)
 Moses Hess Archive at marxists.org
 Moses Hess (1812-1875), from the Jewish Agency for Israel
 Archive of Moses Hess Papers at the International Institute of Social History
 Kalonymos, Gregor Pelger: About the restoration of the Jewish state. Moses Heß (1812-1875) Kalonymos, Gregor Pelger: "Zur Restauration des jüdischen Staates. Moses Heß (1812-1875)"] (in German)

1812 births
1875 deaths
19th-century German philosophers
German communists
19th-century German Jews
German socialists
Jewish philosophers
Jewish socialists
Pantheists
Writers from Bonn
People from the Rhine Province
Philosophers of Judaism
Labor Zionists
Forerunners of Zionism